Anna Maria Russell, Duchess of Bedford (3 September 1783 – 3 July 1857) was a lifelong friend of Queen Victoria, whom she served as a Lady of the Bedchamber between 1837 and 1841.

Anna was the daughter of Charles Stanhope, 3rd Earl of Harrington, and Jane Fleming. She was the wife of Francis Russell, 7th Duke of Bedford (married in 1808), and sister-in-law to the prime minister John Russell. She was also the mother of William Russell, 8th Duke of Bedford. She became Duchess of Bedford in 1839, when her husband acceded to the dukedom.

The Duchess and her husband entertained the Queen at their country house Woburn Abbey in 1841.  The Duchess was also the chief mourner at the funeral of The Princess Augusta Sophia in 1840.

Scandal

The Duchess became involved in a scandal regarding Lady Flora Hastings. When Lady Flora complained of abdominal pain, the court physician initially stated that she was pregnant. As Lady Flora was unmarried this suspicion was covered up, but the Duchess and Baroness Lehzen who disliked her spread the rumour anyway, naming Sir John Conroy as the likely father. When she was later diagnosed with cancer of which she died shortly afterward, the Duchess, Baroness Lehzen  and the Queen herself, who had initially believed the rumour, came under severe public criticism for blemishing the reputation of an innocent woman.

Death
She died in 1857 and is buried in the Bedford chapel at Chenies in Buckinghamshire.

References

Bedford, Anna Maria Stanhope, Duchess of
Bedford, Anna Maria Stanhope, Duchess of
18th-century English nobility
19th-century English nobility
18th-century English women
19th-century English women
English duchesses by marriage
Daughters of British earls
Ladies of the Bedchamber
Anna
Court of Queen Victoria
Duchesses of Bedford